Sapin-sapin is a layered glutinous rice and coconut dessert in Philippine cuisine. It is made from rice flour, coconut milk, sugar, water, flavoring and coloring. It is usually sprinkled with latik or toasted desiccated coconut flakes. 

Traditional recipe of sapin-sapin calls for different flavors mixed in each layer such as ube halaya in the purple layer, jackfruit in the yellow or orange layer, but the white layer has no flavoring. The commercial version tends to have only food coloring and no added flavoring to reduce the cost.

Etymology
Sapin means "layers" while sapin-sapin means "layered" in the Ibanag language and the dessert is recognizable for its layers, each colored separately.

Preparation
Mix the glutinous rice flour and sugar in a large mixing bowl until it becomes smooth, together with the condensed milk, coconut milk, and vanilla extract. Then, divide the mixture into 3 parts. Add the mashed purple yam and ube extract on the first part along with the violet food coloring. Add jackfruit on the second part along with the yellow coloring and then mix well. For the third part, leave as it is.

See also
Kue
Maja blanca
Kue lapis

References

Rice dishes
Philippine desserts
Philippine rice dishes
Foods containing coconut